Julie Elizabeth Harris (born 24 November 1960) is a New Zealand former cricketer who played as a right-arm medium bowler. She appeared in 10 Test matches and 45 One Day Internationals for New Zealand between 1987 and 1997. She played domestic cricket for Wellington.

Harris took a hat-trick at the 1993 World Cup, the second in World Cup history, in a match against the West Indies.

References

External links

1960 births
Living people
Cricketers from Lower Hutt
New Zealand women cricketers
New Zealand women Test cricketers
New Zealand women One Day International cricketers
Women's One Day International cricket hat-trick takers
Wellington Blaze cricketers